Mahmudabad-e Do Dang (also Romanized as Maḩmūdābād-e Do Dāng; also known as Maḩmūdābād-e Do Dāngeh) is a village in Tasuj Rural District, in the Central District of Kavar County, Fars Province, Iran. At the 2006 census, its population was 1,353, in 268 families.

References 

Populated places in Kavar County